Fawful, known in Japan as , is a fictional character appearing in the Mario & Luigi series of role-playing video games developed by AlphaDream, serving as the secondary antagonist of Superstar Saga and the main antagonist of Bowser's Inside Story.

Fawful's dialogue was localized in English-speaking countries to parody the poorly translated English prevalent in early video games; it is schizophasic in nature, rife with non sequiturs. Fawful has received acclaim from both critics and fans due in part to his dialogue as well as his villainy.

Concept and creation
Fawful is a Beanish character and a major antagonist in the Mario series. He was created by Masanori Sato, who worked as the illustrator for Mario & Luigi: Superstar Saga, the first game in the Mario & Luigi series. Fawful's localized Japanese name, Gerakobits, is derived from geragera, the Japanese onomatopoeia for a scornful laugh, while his English name is a pun combining the words "awful" and "guffaw."

Because Fawful was not based on any existing characters in the Mario series, the Nintendo Treehouse, which is responsible for localizing games for North American audiences, had more creative freedom in writing for the character. Bill Trinen and Nate Bihldorff, both employees of the Treehouse, wrote the English dialogue for Fawful through the exchange of notes. Rather than sticking close to the Japanese script, where Fawful simply adds "Fururururu!" to the end of every line, Trinen and Bihldorff intended to make Fawful as "wacky" and "crazy" as possible in the Western release. Thus, in English versions of the games, all of Fawful's dialogue consists of broken English and word salads, like "Have you readiness for this?", and his catchphrase, "I have fury!". In Mario and Luigi: Bowser's Inside Story, Fawful is voiced by Nami Funashima.

Appearances
Fawful first appeared in Mario & Luigi: Superstar Saga where he was the sidekick to the primary antagonist, Cackletta. Fawful assisted Cackletta by helping her steal Princess Peach's voice in order to awaken the Beanstar, a magical item capable of granting wishes. After Cackletta is brutally defeated by Mario and Luigi, Fawful revives her by transferring her soul into the body of Bowser, possessing him. The Mario brothers later defeat Fawful and Cackletta, and destroy the latter. This story is retold in the 2017 Nintendo 3DS remake, Mario & Luigi: Superstar Saga + Bowser's Minions, alongside a previously untold story in which Fawful holds Bowser hostage and sends groups of monsters to fight Bowser's loyal minions who want to free and reunite with their master.

In the prequel/first sequel, Partners in Time, Fawful works as a shopkeeper in the sewers of Princess Peach's castle, continuing to plot his revenge against Mario and Luigi. Fawful can only be encountered by Baby Mario and Baby Luigi, though he does not recognize them as the younger versions of his enemies.

In the next sequel, Bowser's Inside Story, Fawful served as the primary antagonist and villain, assisted by his sidekick Midbus. In this game, he causes Bowser using a "Vacuum Shroom" to inhale Mario, Luigi and everyone in Peach's castle into his body and infects the residents of the Mushroom Kingdom with the "Blorbs" disease, caused by poisonous mushrooms. After dispatching his old nemeses he kidnapped both Peach's (easily) and Bowser's castle (via siege), obtains the sleeping evil entity called Dark Star under Toad Town and awakens it with Peach herself whom he also kidnapped. He absorbed part of the Dark Star with his robotic helmet when it awoke, but Bowser interrupted the process, causing the weakened Dark Star to go in Bowser's lung to read his DNA. Mario and Luigi defeated the Dark Star and destroy its body, which turns it in dark dust. The Dark Star came outside from Bowser and created a new body called Dark Bowser from Bowser's DNA. However, Fawful absorbed part of Dark Bowser's force, making the new form incomplete. Bowser and Dark Bowser searched for Fawful while Fawful searched for Dark Bowser to gain all of its power. Bowser found Fawful first and defeated him, reducing him to a black, spider-like blob, but he escaped from Bowser. Dark Bowser then found Fawful and inhaled him to regain his full power. Later, Bowser battled him, but after being defeated, Fawful, now stronger from the completed dark powers, heals him and makes him grow larger. The only way to defeat him was by punching Dark Bowser's belly, making him spit out Fawful. After Bowser inhales him in the battle, Mario and Luigi battle Fawful in Bowser's body. After being defeated, Dark Bowser destabilizes and is easily defeated with several punches from Bowser. Dark Bowser combusts in colorful sparks and Fawful, who is severely weakened after the battle, promises that he will be good, but lies. He blows himself up in an attempt to take down Mario and Luigi with him, but the brothers survive the explosion, ending the game and shooting every Toad out of Bowser. It is retold in the 2018 Nintendo 3DS remake, Mario & Luigi: Bowser's Inside Story + Bowser Jr.'s Journey, along with a sub-story that tells of three other accomplices – the Best Fitness Friends – in his takeover of Bowser's castle, and their own plot to overthrow Fawful and rule the Mushroom Kingdom themselves.

Reception
Fawful has received critical acclaim from both critics and fans. Editors for Nintendo Power listed him as their fifth favorite villain and wrote that "the Mario bros. may be the bread that makes the sandwich of the Mario & Luigi series, but Fawful is the delicious mustard on that bread." 1UP.com's Jeremy Parish called Fawful a "jabbering lunatic whose broken English made Superstar Saga so hilarious". Eurogamer Italy's Dario Tomaselli described him as one of the most humorous enemies in the Mario series. IGN AU's Cam Shea wrote that while Fawful had "unique cadence", it was "a little tiresome"; he also felt that Fawful should have remained a sidekick. IGN's Lucas M. Thomas wrote that he became a "quick fan-favorite." IGN also stated Fawful as one of the characters they wanted in Mario Kart 7, saying that "his mannerisms and jokes were so genuinely hilarious, then, that fans fell head over heels in love with him." GamesRadar ranked Fawful thirty-ninth in their 2013 list of the best villains in video game history. The staff felt that he dominated the Mario & Luigi series and stated that his quotes made an impact on them. Game Informer listed Fawful as ninth of their deranged video game villain, stating that "Despite his destructive narcissistic personality, Fawful is a well-liked villain thanks to his many memorable quotes."

Fawful has received significant praise for his dialogue. Nintendo Power included the quote "I have fury!" among their collection of classic quotes in Nintendo games. Editors for GamesRadar named him the Runner Up for the "Most Quotable Character" award in 2009; he lost to Ellis from Left 4 Dead 2. GamePros Alicia Ashby also called him "endlessly quotable" and wrote that "everything Fawful does and says is awesome". Video Gamer's Wesley Yin-Poole wrote that his "incorrect syntax" was humorous, and cited such lines as "Beef? I am lacking in beef. Fawful is beefless", and "A winner is you!" as examples. Editor Stephen Totilo called the line "I am the mustard of your doom!" one of the most famous lines in video games of recent years; he added that while it did not compare to famous film quotes, it was "quoted with uncommon frequency". Eurogamer's John Walker called Fawful "so brilliantly spoke in badly translated Japanese game-speak" and wrote that his dialogue was the "ultimate in-joke". The New York Times Charles Herold called him the best character in Superstar Saga, and cited the line mentioned by Totilo above for this. He added that "it's the only Game Boy game I've played that made me laugh out loud".

References

External links
 
Fawful at Super Mario Wiki

Anthropomorphic video game characters
Dictator characters in video games
Fictional terrorists
Fictional shopkeepers
Fictional mad scientists
Fictional inventors in video games
Fictional henchmen in video games
Mad scientist characters in video games
Fictional mass murderers
Male characters in video games
Mario (franchise) characters
Mario (franchise) enemies
Male villains
Nintendo antagonists
Video game bosses
Video game characters introduced in 2003
Mario & Luigi